"Maybe" is the third single from Sick Puppies' third album Tri-Polar, which impacted rock radio on 22 June 2010. A remix version was made for pop radio stations, and the official music video.

The song features a bright sound characteristic of post-grunge.

The song was featured as iTunes' single of the week on the week of December 18–25, 2010.

Music video
The music video was released on 12 October 2010 on Yahoo music and the official website of Sick Puppies. It shows two people who had had enough of their respective jobs in the middle of nowhere, and they separately move to Venice Beach to improve their lives, and by the end of the video, they meet up. Actors Tanner Novlan and Kayla Ewell play the two people who met each other (coincidentally, they would be married in real life five years later). The video also shows the band playing on a highway. It was directed by Travis Kopach, the performance footage was shot in the Mojave Desert.

Track listing

Charts
"Maybe" was the band's first song that made it into the Hot 100, peaking at No. 56. It spent five weeks at number one on the Heatseekers chart (which ranks songs by acts that had never reached the top 50 on the Hot 100), making it their second number-one hit. On the Alternative Songs chart, the song peaked at No. 6. It became their first single to reach the Mainstream Top 40 chart, as well as their first international charting single.

Weekly charts

Year-end charts

Certifications

References

Sick Puppies songs
2010 singles
2009 songs
Songs written by Shimon Moore
Song recordings produced by Rock Mafia
Virgin Records singles
Songs written by Marti Frederiksen
Songs written by Emma Anzai